Golden Gate Academy (GGA) was founded in 1923 as a Seventh-day Adventist Elementary and High School on Mountain Boulevard in Berkeley, California. It remained there for 23 years until it moved to its current position in the Oakland Hills next to Holy Names University in 1949.

The Northern California Conference of the Adventist church closed down Golden Gate Academy for lack of enrollment.  The grounds are now used as a private arts school.  The nearest K-8 Adventist elementary school to GGA is San Francisco Adventist School, located near City College of San Francisco.  The nearest Adventist High School to GGA is Pleasant Hill Adventist Academy.

See also 

 List of Seventh-day Adventist secondary schools
 Seventh-day Adventist education

References

External links
 Golden Gate Academy Reorganization

 	

Education in Oakland, California
Educational institutions established in 1923
Adventist secondary schools in the United States
Schools in Alameda County, California
Private middle schools in California
Private elementary schools in California
Former Seventh-day Adventist institutions
1923 establishments in California